Teresa Perozzi (born 31 December 1974) is an American-Bermudian former professional boxer who competed from 2003 to 2014. She held the WBA female middleweight title from 2011 to 2012 and also challenged for multiple world titles throughout her career; the WBA, WBC, WIBF, and WIBA super-middleweight titles in 2008; the WBO female middleweight title in 2010; and the WBC female middleweight title twice in 2012 and 2013.

She has fought in her career Natascha Ragosina and Aasa Sandell among others.

On November 21, 2014 in her first fight in almost 2 years, Perozzi was beaten - due to referee stoppage - in the 3rd round at the Fairmont, Southampton by Kali Reis in a match for the vacant International Boxing Association women's middleweight title. She retired after this loss.

Championship titles
WBA Female Middleweight title
Two title defenses
WBO Female Middleweight title
WBC International Middleweight title
NABC Middleweight title
WIBC Middleweight title

Professional boxing record

References

1973 births
Living people
Boxers from New Hampshire
American women boxers
Bermudian women boxers
People from Warwick Parish
American emigrants to Bermuda
Bermudian people of American descent
World middleweight boxing champions